Hinemoa Elder  is a New Zealand youth forensic psychiatrist and former television presenter. She is a professor in indigenous research at Te Whare Wānanga o Awanuiārangi, a fellow of the Royal Australian and New Zealand College of Psychiatrists, and sits on the Māori Advisory Committee of the Centre for Brain Research.

Before training in medicine she was a presenter on 3.45 LIVE!, a children's television programme on TVNZ.

Career 
Elder started her career in the media as an actress and television personality. After her mother was diagnosed with breast cancer, Elder enrolled at the University of Auckland to study medicine. She graduated in 1999 and went on to specialise in child and adolescent psychiatry. From 2007 to 2011 she worked as a youth forensic psychiatrist in the Waikato, Auckland and Northland regions and completed post-graduate studies in forensic psychology. Her doctoral thesis, completed at Massey University in 2012, focused on the development of tikanga approaches for Māori children who experienced traumatic brain injury. In 2015 she was a participant in a neurological research think tank at the University of Deusto, Spain, which aimed to strengthen international collaborative research partnerships in the field.

Elder has served on a number of reference groups for the Ministry of Health including the expert advisory group of Blueprint II, which established the framework for New Zealand mental health service funding. She is a deputy member of the New Zealand Mental Health Review Tribunal and a specialist assessor under the Intellectual Disability Compulsory Care and Rehabilitation Act 2003. Elder is also a research associate of the Person Centred Research Centre, the National Institute for Stroke and Applied Neurosciences and is a trustee and director of Emerge Aotearoa, a non-governmental organisation.

Recognition 
In 2014, Elder received a Health Research Council of New Zealand Eru Pomare Post Doctoral Fellowship which allowed her to extend the work of her doctorate. In 2017 Elder received the Innovation and Science Award at the New Zealand Women of Influence Awards.

In the 2019 Queen's Birthday Honours, Elder was appointed a Member of the New Zealand Order of Merit, for services to psychiatry and Māori.

Publications 

 Maea te Toi Ora: Māori Health Transformations, 2018 (co-contributor)

Personal life 
Elder grew up in England with her Māori mother and New Zealand european father, returning to New Zealand when she was eleven. She is of English descent, and from Ngāti Kurī, Te Rarawa, Te Aupōuri and Ngāpuhi iwi. 

Elder is the former partner of the late broadcaster Paul Holmes and had a son, Reuben, with him. Holmes was step-father to Elder's daughter from a previous relationship, Millie Elder-Holmes.

References

Living people
Year of birth missing (living people)
New Zealand television presenters
New Zealand women television presenters
Ngāti Kurī people
Te Rarawa people
Te Aupōuri people
Ngāpuhi people
University of Auckland alumni
Massey University alumni
Forensic psychologists
Academic staff of Te Whare Wānanga o Awanuiārangi
New Zealand Women of Influence Award recipients
Members of the New Zealand Order of Merit
New Zealand Māori women academics
New Zealand psychiatrists
New Zealand women psychiatrists